The Power of Big Oil is a three-part 2022 documentary miniseries produced by WGBH for the investigative documentary television program Frontline, which airs in the United States on PBS. It is an examination of what the public, businesses, governments, and scientists have known for decades on climate change, as well as the numerous opportunities that were lost to help mitigate the issue. 

The episodes called Denial, Doubt, and Delay, examine how industry was researching climate change as early as the 1970s, how it attempted to cast doubt on the science, and how it influenced public perception and policy. It spans a half-century and draws on interviews with world leaders, oil industry scientists, whistleblowers, lobbyists, and executives, as well as newly discovered internal documents.

Backstory 
The producers of the series were looking at answering a simple question – how did we get here? According to Frontline senior producer Dan Edge, they were looking at what choices were made, what opportunities were lost, and what cautions were simply disregarded.  What, when, and how much did the fossil fuel industry know about climate change and what was done with what they knew.  The series investigates how and why, particularly in the United States, that fundamental reality was successfully and dramatically obscured by organizations deliberately spreading misinformation about climate change.

Synopsis

Part 1: Denial 
Part 1: Denial, reveals how studies on climate change were conducted by the fossil fuel industry in the 1970s, how it denied the science, and the role it played in delaying and preventing action on climate change over the past four decades. It also examines how an industry coalition and, ultimately, politicians were able to deflate any hopes that the U.S. would ever sign on to the Kyoto Protocol.

Part 2: Doubt 
Part 2: Doubt, investigates the industry's attempts to obstruct climate policy by casting doubt, despite mounting evidence of climate change in the new millennium.

Part 3: Delay 
Part 3: Delay, looks at the strategies used by the fossil fuel industry, including advancing natural gas as a cleaner energy source, in the hopes of slowing down the transition to renewable energy sources.

Cast 
Frontline interviewed a variety of people including scientists, corporate executives, directors, employees of public relation firms, and former senators and congressmen of the United States.

Release 
The Power of Big Oil was first released on the PBS television network in the United States.  The episodes were broadcast on the investigative program Frontline for three consecutive weeks.  Part 1: Denial, an 85-minute episode was aired April 19, 2022. Part 2: Doubt, and Part 3: Delay are each 54-minute episodes. 

On July 21, 2022, PBS Distribution released the series on DVD, and the Mongoose Pictures and Frontline production was broadcast on the BBC Two television channel and added to the BBC iPlayer streaming service in the United Kingdom.

Reception

Critical response 
The Power of Big Oil was generally well received.  Mike Hale, television critic for The New York Times writes, "One lesson the show offers, almost in passing, is the way in which the refusal to accept the reality of climate change prefigured the wider attacks on science." He concludes with, “The Power of Big Oil” offers no comfort; it ends, in a rush, with the environmental rollbacks enacted by President Donald Trump and the energy crunch the Biden administration now faces because of Russia’s war in Ukraine." In the Progressive Magazine, Ed Rampell stated, "This powerful documentary is essential viewing for anyone concerned with the climate crisis—and how efforts to take appropriate action were corrupted by behind-the-scenes big money interests." Chris McGreal, writer for The Guardian reported that the series "charts corporate manipulation of science, public opinion and politicians that mirrors conduct by other industries, from big tobacco to the pharmaceutical companies responsible for America’s opioid epidemic."

Accolades 
The production created for the BBC earned the Albert Sustainable Production Certification for film & TV in the United Kingdom.

See also

References

External links 
 
 PBS Peril & Promise - The Power of Big Oil
 
 The Power of Big Oil – transcript

2020s American films
2022 documentary films
American documentary films
Climate change denial
Climate change in the United States
ExxonMobil controversies
National Geographic Society films